St Jude's Church, Birmingham is a former parish church in the Church of England in Birmingham.

History
The parish was formed in August 1846 from parts of the parishes of St Martin in the Bull Ring and St Philip's. Building of the church started in 1850 when the Bishop of Worcester laid the foundation stone on 14 August and it was consecrated on 26 July 1851 by the Bishop of Worcester.

In 1861, the church opened St Jude's Schools, also on Hill Street.

A restoration project was undertaken in 1879.

In 1905, the Society of the Precious Blood was started when Mother Millicent Mary SPB (formerly Millicent Taylor) took her vows in the church.

Depopulation of the city centre resulted in poor attendance, and the church was demolished in 1971. The site on Hill Street is now occupied by the Albany Banqueting Suite built in 1975.

Organ

The church was equipped with a pipe organ by Edward James Bossward dating from 1867. It was opened on 19 May 1867 and had 13 stops. A specification of the organ can be found on the National Pipe Organ Register.

For over 40 years, until the church closed in 1971, the organist was Lawrence Briggs, grandfather of the organist and composer David Briggs. Upon closure, the organ was transferred to Clayesmore School in Dorset, and then moved to St Michael and All Angels Church, Exeter in 2013.

References

Church of England church buildings in Birmingham, West Midlands
Churches completed in 1851
Jude
1846 establishments in England
Buildings and structures demolished in 1971